Soap Opera, subtitled The Lester Persky Story, is a 1964 feature-length underground film directed by Andy Warhol, starring Baby Jane Holzer, and featuring Gerard Malanga, Sam Green, and Ivy Nicholson. The subtitle was used by Warhol since he used old television advertisement footage provided by Lester Persky.

See also
List of American films of 1964
Andy Warhol filmography

References

External links
Soap Opera at WarholStars

1964 films
Films directed by Andy Warhol
American independent films
1960s English-language films
1960s American films